Caterina Tarabotti (active until 1690) was an Italian female painter of the Baroque period. She was born in Venice, and a pupil of Alessandro Varotari, called Padovino, (1588-1649) and his sister Chiara (1584-1663 c.a). The sister of proto-feminist writer Arcangela Tarabotti, she practiced chiefly in Vicenza (her paintings at chiesa di San Silvestro were destroyed in 1938),  where she painted historical pictures. She died in financial constraints at the Ospedaletto di San Giobbe in Venice on 8 February 1693, aged 78.

Biography
The daughter of Stefano Bernardino of the late Marc'Antonio and of Maria Cadena, she was the penultimate and sixth daughter (out of 11 children) of Stefano Bernardino (1574-1642) and Maria Cadena (1575?-1649). She was baptized at San Pietro in Castello parish church, in the borough of Castello, in Venice, on the 15 June 1615.

In 1617 she moved with her family to live near San Nicolò dei Tolentini, borough of Santa Croce, at the other edge of Venice, where her father run a manufacture of sublimates.

There is no documentary evidence of her training as a painter at least in her family papers. However, painter Alessandro Varotari appears among the best men at her sister Lorenzina's wedding with Giacomo Pighetti, on 21 February 1640, when Caterina was then aged 25.

She remained single, since her family could not afford to pay a marital dowry for her, after having provider one also for her other sister Innocenza. In 1647, aged 30, went living together with her sister Angela, a spinster aged 40, at some relative's place in Venice, as a lodger. In her will, written in the same year, her mother Maria nee Cadena left her the yearly income of 60 ducats, which would be the amount required to enter a convent as a nun.

As a matter of fact, both Caterina and Angela Tarabotti entered eventually Corpus Domini nunnery in Vicenza as lodgers on 1st August 1648. Angela died there in 1685. Caterina left on 23 November 1650 and spent a period in Sant'Anna in Castello nunnery, where her sister, the proto-feminist well established writer suor Arcangela, died on 22 February 1652, possibly nursing her.

In the following years, Caterina had to fight for her legal possessions against her brother Lorenzo (1610-1661) and his heirs. In 1674 she was living at Rio delle Chiovere, where her nephews Dario had rented her a flat at the symbolic price of 1 ducat per year, due to their debt with her of 850 ducats.

In 1690, when writing her will, Caterina was living with her servant and heir at the Ospedaletto di San Giobbe in financial constraints. She left only a painting to her grand-niece Lorenzina Badoer nee Pighetti. She died on 8 February 1693, aged 78.

In her posthumous book, Semplicity deceived, published in Leiden, by Elzevier in 1654, Arcangela Tarabotti possibly writes about her sister Caterina, when stating:

"Let the proof be a young woman closely related to me, gifted with abundant wit and talents. In no time she reached the point of competing with Apollo in music and poetry, with Apelles in painting, with Minerva in learning, and with Nature herself in sculpting small animals so realistically that, but the fact they do not move or fly away, you would think they were alive".

In 1660 Marco Boschini listed Caterina Tarabotti among the great Venetian painters of his days, opposite to Lanzi (Dizionario biografico delle donne illustri, Milan, Bettoni, 1822, vol. III, p. 171). She appears among the Venetian artists in Quinto catalogo de gli pittori di nome che al presente vivono in Venetia, in Venetia città nobilissima et singolare descritta in XIV libri da M. Francesco Sansovino (Venice, Stefano Curti, 1663, p.23).

A church in Vicenza with some frescoes by Caterina went destroyed during Second World War. Caterina' Will lists two paintings of her.

References
 

- Medioli, Francesca. Arcangela Tarabotti: una famiglia non detta e un segreto indicibile in famiglia, "Archivio veneto", n. 5, 2013, CXLIV, pp. 105–144, in part pp. 111, 113, 116. 124, 125-130.

- Tarabotti, Arcangela, Paternal Tiranny, edited and translated by Letizia Panizza, Chicago&London, Chicago University Press, 2004, pp. 100–101.

1615 births
1693 deaths
17th-century Italian painters
17th-century Italian women artists
18th-century Italian women artists
Italian Baroque painters
Italian women painters
Painters from Venice
Painters from Verona